Stillhouse Hollow Falls State Natural Area, located in Summertown, is a natural area in Maury County, Tennessee. The main feature of the area is Stillhouse Hollow Falls, a  waterfall, which is located approximately two-thirds of a mile from the entrance. The natural area was acquired by the Tennessee Parks and Greenways Foundation (TPGF) and was later sold to the state of Tennessee. It was designated a natural area on June 3, 2006, under the Natural Areas Preservation Act of 1971.

External links
 Stillhouse Hollow Falls State Natural Area official website
 Tennessee Landforms: Stillhouse Hollow Falls

State parks of Tennessee
Protected areas of Lawrence County, Tennessee
Protected areas established in 2006
2006 establishments in Tennessee
Waterfalls of Tennessee
Landforms of Lawrence County, Tennessee